Isabel Gray (1851–1929) was a publican, storekeeper and prostitute in Eulo, Queensland, Australia.

Isabel Richardson was born around 1851 in either England or Mauritius.  She came to Australia some time before 1869, when she married James McIntosh in Warialda.  He died shortly afterwards and two years later she married Richard William Robinson, a station manager from Surat.  They moved to Eulo where they ran hotels, stores and a butcher and in 1889 Robinson bought the Royal mail Hotel in Eulo. In 1892, Isabel and her husband were charged with a variety of offenses, including disorderly conduct, assaulting the police, purchasing a sheep illegally, and passing a dishonored cheque.  In response, she sued the police for assault, false imprisonment and malicious prosecution.  By this time she was already known as the "Queen of Eulo".

References

People from Queensland
Australian businesspeople in retailing
1851 births
1929 deaths
19th-century Australian women
20th-century Australian women